Sorbus frutescens is a species of rowan native to Gansu province of China. Often mistakenly lumped in with Sorbus koehneana, it is a very small tree reaching only 2m at maturity, with white fruit against dark green pinnate leaves which turn shades of red and bronze in autumn.

It has gained the Royal Horticultural Society's Award of Garden Merit as an ornamental.

References

frutescens
Trees of China
Endemic flora of China
Plants described in 2005